Munir al-Ajlani (Dr. Munir Ajlani, منير محمد علي العجلاني) (August 1912 or 1914 – 20 June 2004) (nationality: Syrian/Saudi) was a politician, writer, lawyer, and scholar. He made history as the youngest Syrian minister. He received his doctorate at a very young age from La Sorbonne University in Paris.

Family history and controversy

Some sources say that Ajlani was born in 1904. It is believed that al-Ajlani changed his date of birth on official records to be considered for parliament at an early age.

He married Inam al-Hasani, daughter of president Taj al-Din al-Hasani, in 1943.
They had five children: Manar al-Ajlani,  Fawaz al-Ajlani, Amir al-Ajlani, Nawara al-Ajlani, and Munira al-Ajlani.

The Ajlani family's origin goes back to the Ashraf of Saudi Arabia. Their descendants travelled and settled in Damascus at the time when Damascus was a center for knowledge. Dr Munir Al-Ajlani was born into this family of academic and material wealth. The Ajlani family became one of the most well-known and wealthiest families in Syria.

Education

Ajlani, born into an upper-class family that owned much land, followed in his family's footsteps. He studied at the University of Damascus then continued his studies in Paris where he earned his Phd from La Sorbonne University. Ajlani studied law and obtained a minor degree in literature and linguistics.

Bibliography
 آوراق (Papers)
 عبقرية الاسلام في آصول الحكم (The Genius of Islam in Governing)
 الحقوق الرومانية، الدستورية
 آزهار الألم (Poetry Book Flowers of Pain)
 رجل في جلد آخر (A Man in Another Man's Skin)
 عجائب الدنيا السبع (The Seven Wonders of the World)
 فيصل
 La constitution de la Syrie
 معاوية، عائشة، زنوبية
 Prelude to Nizar Qabbani's first set of poems in 1944 entitled: "The Brunette Said to Me"

References

Sami Moubayed "Steel & Silk: Men and Women Who Shaped Syria 1900–2000" (Cune Press, Seattle, 2005).
Elizabeth Thompson "Colonial Citizens: Republican Rights, Paternal Privilege, and Gender in French Syria & Lebanon". Chapter 11, P. 193. (Columbia University Press, 1999)
Dr. Munir al-Ajlani, Syrian History: Online Museum of Syrian History. (www.syrianhistory.com/search/node/al-ajlani). Online. Retrieved 2010-01-01.
Mideast & N. Africa Encyclopedia: Taj al-Din al-Hasani.
Mid East Views, www.mideastviews.com/articleview.php?art=394. Online. Retrieved 2010-01-01.
Mid East Views, www.mideastviews.com/ajlani.htm. Online. Retrieved 2010-01-01.
Arab Soul, arabicsoul.multiply.com/reviews/item/68. Online. Retrieved 2010-01-01.
Study for UAE, www.study4uae.com/vb/archive/index.php/t-5654.html. Online. Retrieved 2010-01-01.
Biographies: Poems & Poetry. www.poems-and-poetry.com/biographies/nizar-qabbani-biography. Retrieved 2010-01-01.
Publication: Terrorism Monitor Volume: 3 Issue: 16.
 
http://www.aawsat.com/details.asp?section=4&issueno=9344&article=241882&feature=

1910s births
University of Paris alumni
2004 deaths
20th-century Syrian lawyers
Syrian ministers of justice
Syrian ministers of education
National Bloc (Syria) politicians
20th-century Syrian politicians
Syrian expatriates in France